The  in Berlin, Germany, is one of the leading universities of music in Europe. It was established in East Berlin in 1950 as the  because the older  (now the Berlin University of the Arts) was in West Berlin. After the death of one of its first professors, composer Hanns Eisler, the school was renamed in his honor in 1964.

The  has a variety of ensembles including chamber music, choirs, orchestras and jazz.

The Hochschule

The Hochschule is structured in four divisions and four institutes. It offers programs in accordion, composition, conducting, coaching, drums, guitar, harmony and counterpoint, harp, jazz, music theatre, opera direction, strings, timpani, piano and wind instruments.
The 2002 founded Kurt-Singer-Institut specializes on research on health for musicians. Since 2003 the Institut für neue Musik deals with contemporary music. With the foundation of the Jazz-Institut Berlin in 2005, the conservatoire gained an international level in jazz education; David Friedman, John Hollenbeck, Judy Niemack and Jiggs Whigham are counted among the professors.

Every year, over 400 events are taking place – including concerts, opera productions, class recitals and exam concerts. The Hochschule collaborates with the Konzerthaus Berlin and the Berlin Philharmonic Foundation. In both these houses regular orchestral, choral and staff concerts are presented.

History

After the foundation of the German Democratic Republic (GDR), all music schools and the only music college were situated in the west of Berlin. Hence the GDR Ministry for Education decided to establish a music college in the east sector. On 1 October 1950 the Deutsche Hochschule für Musik was founded. Professor Georg Knepler was the first director of the school. The teaching staff included Rudolph Wagner-Régeny and Hanns Eisler (composition), Helmut Koch (conducting), Helma Prechter, Arno Schellenberg (voice), Carl Adolf Martiensse, Grete Herwig (piano), Gustav Havemann, Wilhelm Martens (violin), Bernhard Günther (cello), Werner Buchholz (viola) and Ewald Koch (clarinet).
 
Since 1964 the conservatoire has been named Hochschule für Musik Hanns Eisler Berlin. In 1950 a special school for music was founded. The conservatory built up a partnership with the Carl Philipp Emanuel Bach Schule.

In 1953 the program of opera and musical theatre stage direction was established, as two students were interested in this subject. Thus the conservatory became one of the first schools in Europe to have a program of that kind.
 
The state of Berlin following the 1990 German reunification took over the conservatory. Today it is under the jurisdiction of the Senate department of science, research and the arts.

People

Some notable alumni

 Taner Akyol, composer
 , clarinet
 Maria Baptist, pianist and conductor
 Thomas Böttger, pianist and composer
 Caroline Fischer, pianist
 Vladimir Jurowski, conductor
 Sol Gabetta, cellist
 Marek Kalbus, bass-baritone 
 Georg Katzer, composer and teacher
 Akil Mark Koci, composer and writer
 Peter Konwitschny, opera and theatre director
 Jochen Kowalski, alto
 Siegfried Matthus (1934–2021), composer and opera director
 Tilo Medek (1940–2006), composer
 Johannes Moser, cellist
 Vera Nemirova (born 1972), stage director
 Anna Prohaska, soprano
 Michael Sanderling, conductor and violoncellist
 Diana Tishchenko (born 1990), Ukrainian violinist
 Jörg-Peter Weigle, conductor and music professor
 Kahchun Wong, conductor
 Ji-Yeoun You, pianist
 Robert Zollitsch, composer

Some notable present and former faculty

 Fabio Bidini (piano)
 Willy Decker (honorary professor of musical theatre direction)
 Hanns Eisler (composition)
 Michael Endres (piano)
 David Geringas (cello)
 Helmut Koch (conductor) (conducting, from 1952)
 Peter Konwitschny (opera direction)
 Gidon Kremer (violin and chamber music)
 Hanspeter Kyburz (composition)
 Hanno Müller-Brachmann (voice)
 Marie Luise Neunecker (horn)
 Boris Piergamienszczikow (cello)
 Thomas Quasthoff (voice)
 Corinna von Rad (visiting 
professor of opera direction)
 Scot Weir (voice)
 Kurt Rosenwinkel (jazz guitar)
 Rainer Seegers (visiting professor of percussion)
 Júlia Varady (opera interpretation)
 Katharina Wagner (opera direction)
 Rudolf Wagner-Régeny (composition)
 Dieter Zechlin (piano)
 Ruth Zechlin (composition, counterpoint, instrumentation)
 Tabea Zimmermann (viola)

Senators of honour
 Claudio Abbado, Italian conductor
 Daniel Barenboim, Israeli pianist
 Sir Simon Rattle, British conductor
 Wolfgang Rihm, German composer

See also
Music schools in Germany
Neuer Marstall

References

External links

International Hanns Eisler Society
EislerMusic.com
 Effects of the Bologna Declaration on Professional Music Training in Europe
 European Association of Conservatoires (AEC)

 
Educational institutions established in 1950
1950 establishments in East Germany
Universities and colleges in Berlin